Stay Away, Joe is a 1968 American comedy western film with musical interludes, set in modern times and starring Elvis Presley, Burgess Meredith, Katy Jurado and Joan Blondell. Directed by Peter Tewksbury, the film is based on the 1953 satirical farce novel of the same name by Dan Cushman. The film reached number 65 on the Variety weekly national box office chart in 1968.

Plot
Native American rodeo rider Joe Lightcloud is a Navajo whose family still lives on the reservation. He returns to the reservation in a white Cadillac convertible that he uses to drive cattle.

Joe persuades his congressman to give him 20 heifers and a prize bull so that he and his father can prove that the Navajos can successfully raise cattle on the reservation. If their experiment is successful, the government will help all the Navajo people. But Joe's friend Bronc Hoverty accidentally barbecues the prize bull, while Joe sells the heifers to buy home improvements for his stepmother Annie Lightcloud.

Joe is able to borrow a bull named Dominick, but the bull is homosexual and shows no interest in the heifers. Mamie Callahan, the daughter of shotgun-toting tavern owner Glenda Callahan, can't seem to stay away from the girl-chasing Joe. Joe trades in his horse at a used car dealership for a red convertible automobile from which he sells off the parts to obtain cash from a salvage yard. After almost all of the usable car parts are sold, Joe rides around on a beat-up motorcycle.

To raise money, Joe organizes a contest in which riders have to ride Dominick the bull. Joe has to ride Dominick and hang on in order to win the prize money, which he does. In a fight at his father's house, Joe and his friends are involved in a large fight that destroys the house that they have been building.

Cast
 Elvis Presley as Joe Lightcloud
 Burgess Meredith as Charlie Lightcloud
 Joan Blondell as Glenda Callahan
 Katy Jurado as Annie Lightcloud
 Thomas Gomez as Grandpa
 Henry Jones as Hy Slager
 L.Q. Jones as Bronc Hoverty
 Quentin Dean as Mamie Callahan
 Douglas Henderson as Congressman Morrissey
 Dick Wilson as Car Salesman
 Joe Esposito (uncredited)
 Charlie Hodge (uncredited)

Production
Burt Kennedy was originally announced as director.

Presley was paid $850,000 plus 40% of the profits.

The screenplay was adapted from the failed Broadway musical Whoop-Up and retained many of the same plot devices and characters, including Joe's grandfather who refuses to live in a house, preferring his ancestral teepee.

Soundtrack
For the first time since Wild in the Country, neither an LP record nor an extended-play single was planned for a Presley film soundtrack. Three songs were written for the film by the team of Sid Wayne and Ben Weisman, who had already contributed close to 50 songs for various Presley movies in the decade.

Although released before Speedway, this film and its soundtrack were made after the first of Presley's last five films in the 1960s in which musical numbers were kept to a minimum. The recording session took place at RCA Studio B in Nashville on October 1, 1967. At the end of the session, Presley made his record producer Felton Jarvis promise to never release "Dominick," the song written for him to sing to the bull. However, the song is actually sung to two women in the movie without the bull present. "Dominick" would eventually make its first official CD appearance on the Kissin Cousins/Clambake/Stay Away, Joe soundtrack compilation in 1994 (long after the deaths of Presley and Jarvis); it had previously been released, unauthorized, as "Dominick the Impotent Bull" on the 1982 bootleg compilation Elvis' Greatest Shit. The other two songs, "Stay Away, Joe" and "All I Needed Was the Rain," were not even featured on a promotional single for the film premiere, but instead respectively appeared on the budget albums Let's Be Friends in 1970 and Elvis Sings Flaming Star in 1969.

Two additional songs related to the film were recorded at sessions on January 10 and 11, 1968 at the same studio. "Goin' Home" by Joy Byers would not be used, surfacing on the soundtrack to the next Presley film, Speedway, while a different song entitled "Stay Away," rewritten from the tune of "Greensleeves" by Sid Tepper and Roy C. Bennett, would appear as the B-side to the #28 hit single "U.S. Male." Released as catalog item 47-9465b on February 28, 1968, the B-side "Stay Away" would peak at #68 on the Billboard Hot 100 independently of "U.S. Male." The producer in charge of the recordings for MGM was Jeff Alexander.

Personnel
 Elvis Presley – vocals
 The Jordanaires – backing vocals
 Pete Drake – pedal steel guitar
 Scotty Moore, Chip Young – electric guitar
 Charlie Hodge – acoustic guitar
 Charlie McCoy – organ, harmonica
 Hoyt Hawkins – organ
 Floyd Cramer – piano
 Bob Moore – double bass
 D.J. Fontana, Buddy Harman – drums

Film music track listing
 "Stay Away" (Sid Tepper and Roy C. Bennett) (melody taken from "Greensleeves)"- heard over opening credits
 "Stay Away, Joe" (Sid Wayne and Ben Weisman)
 "All I Needed Was the Rain" (Sid Wayne and Ben Weisman)
 "Dominick" (Sid Wayne and Ben Weisman)

Reception
Kevin Thomas of the Los Angeles Times wrote that the film "... could scarcely seem more embarrassingly tasteless or ill-timed than right now. In an unintentionally patronizing way it projects an image of the Indian as happy-go-lucky, immoral and irresponsible just when the public is becoming aware of how truly tragic his plight is. No amount of good-naturedness—and 'Stay Away, Joe!' undeniably has plenty of that—can compensate for humor based on stereotypes so offensive to minority-group sensitivities." However, Thomas suggested that if it had been made in a different time, "... it would seem a pretty good picture. It has plenty of bounce, a strong cast ... some spunky songs and good color photography of natural locales."

A review in Variety reported "generally flat comedy" with "many forced slapstick situations", and echoed Thomas's review by stating that the story was "... out of touch with latterday appreciation of some basic dignity in all human beings ... At best, film is a dim artistic accomplishment; at worst, it caters to outdated prejudice. Custer himself might be embarrassed — for the Indians."

The Monthly Film Bulletin reported: "Meandering Elvis Presley comedy, rather short on invention except for an amiably hectic finale ... The musical offerings are if anything even less memorable than usual."

References

External links
 
 
 
 
 Elvis – The Hollywood Collection (Kissin' Cousins/Girl Happy/Tickle Me/Stay Away, Joe/Live a Little, Love a Little/Charro!) Review by Stuart Galbraith IV at DVD Talk, September 11, 2007.

1968 films
1960s musical films
American Western (genre) comedy films
Films directed by Peter Tewksbury
Films based on Western (genre) novels
Films based on American novels
Films scored by Jack Marshall
Metro-Goldwyn-Mayer films
Neo-Western films
1960s Western (genre) comedy films
1968 comedy films
Films about Native Americans
1960s English-language films
1960s American films